David Cullen may refer to:
 David Cullen (basketball) (born 1969), Irish basketball player
 David Cullen (ice hockey) (born 1976), Canadian ice hockey defenceman
 David Cullen (politician) (born 1960), Wisconsin State Assemblyman
 David Cullen (musician) (born 1959), guitarist
 David Mark Cullen, British general
 Dave Cullen, American writer, author of Columbine